is a passenger railway station located in the Haruhino neighborhood of  Asao-ku, Kawasaki, Kanagawa, Japan and operated by the private railway operator Odakyu Electric Railway.

Lines

Station layout

Haruhino Station is an elevated station with two opposed side platforms serving two tracks. The station building is elevated, and built on a cantilever extending over the platforms and tracks. The station uses a hybrid power system. For additional electric power, the station has solar cell on the roof and a wind power generator.

Facilities and accessibility
The station is fully wheelchair accessible, with escalators and elevators connecting the overbridge between the platforms. Universal access toilets are located on both platforms.

Platforms

History
Haruhino Station opened on December 11, 2004.

Passenger statistics
In fiscal 2019, the station was used by an average of 10,048  passengers daily.

The passenger figures for previous years are as shown below.

Surrounding area
 Wakabadai Station (Keio Sagamihara Line)

See also
 List of railway stations in Japan

References

External links

 Odakyu station information  

Railway stations in Kanagawa Prefecture
Railway stations in Japan opened in 2004
Stations of Odakyu Electric Railway
Railway stations in Kawasaki, Kanagawa